Psychiatric Clinics of North America is a quarterly peer-reviewed medical journal covering psychiatry and patient management. It was established in 1978 and is published by Elsevier. The current editor of the journal is Harsh Trivedi.

Publishing and editorship 

The journal is indexed in Index Medicus, MEDLINE, and PubMed from 1981 onwards.

Among the first major publishing projects, in the wake of the launch of the journal, was a series of symposiums on chosen subjects in the field of psychiatry. Each volume was assigned to an editor. In 1978 the journal published a symposium on obesity under the editorship of Albert J. Stunkard. In 1979 the journal published a second volume in liaison psychiatry, under the editorship of Chase Patterson Kimball.

This trend in publishing continued in the 1980s. 1980 saw the release of volume 3 in the symposium on sexuality, under the editorship of Jon K. Meyer, and in 1981 followed a volume on borderline disorders, edited by Michael H. Stone.

In 1984 the journal published a symposium on multiple personality under the editorship of Bennett G. Braun, and the following year saw the publication of two volumes, first a symposium on Self-Destructive Behavior, edited by Alec Roy, then a volume on Child Psychiatry, edited by J.H Beitchman.

References

External links

Journal page at publisher's website

Publications established in 1978
Quarterly journals
English-language journals
Psychiatry journals
Elsevier academic journals